Zimatlán de Alvarez is a town and municipality in Oaxaca in south-western Mexico. The municipality covers an area of 255.16 km². 
It is part of the Zimatlán District in the west of the Valles Centrales Region

As of 2005, the municipality had a total population of 18,370.

References

External links
 Santos in Oaxaca's Ancient Churches: San Lorenzo Zimatlán - Art-historical study of artworks in the church, with photographs.

Municipalities of Oaxaca